Eucalyptus cernua, commonly known as the red-flowered moort or the yellow-flowered moort, is a eucalypt that is native to Western Australia.

Description
It has smooth mottled grey to brown coloured bark that can become black over greenish yellow new bark. It has no lignotuber and a single stem. The concolorous glossy green adult leaves are arranged alternately. It blooms between October and December and produces crimson-red flowers.

Taxonomy
The species was first formally described by the botanists Ian Brooker and Stephen Hopper in 2002 and Taxonomy of species deriving from the publication of Eucalyptus subseries Cornutae Benth. (Myrtaceae) as published in the journal Nuytsia.
The specific epithet is taken from the Latin word cernuus meaning nodding, towards earth in reference referring to the downward facing inflorescences.
The species was previously thought to have been Eucalyptus nutans.

Distribution
It has a limited range along the south coast of Western Australia in the Goldfields-Esperance region near Ravensthorpe particularly in the Fitzgerald River National Park.

Cultivation
It is used for ornamental plantings, shade and honey production. When cultivated it can tolerate arid area, is slow growing and requires little maintenance.

See also
List of Eucalyptus species

References

cernua
Endemic flora of Western Australia
Mallees (habit)
Myrtales of Australia
Eucalypts of Western Australia
Trees of Australia
Goldfields-Esperance
Plants described in 2002
Taxa named by Stephen Hopper
Taxa named by Ian Brooker